Santo Antão, Portuguese for "Saint Anthony", may refer to the following places.

Brazil
Vitória de Santo Antão, Pernambuco

Cape Verde
Santo Antão, Cape Verde, the northwesternmost island in Cape Verde archipelago

Portugal
Santo Antão (Évora), a civil parish in the municipality of Évora
Santo Antão do Tojal, a civil parish in the municipality of Loures
Santo Antão (Calheta), a civil parish in the municipality of Calheta, São Jorge, Azores